The Harry S. Truman Scholarship is the premier graduate fellowship in the United States for public service leadership. It is a federally funded scholarship granted to U.S. undergraduate students for demonstrated leadership potential, academic excellence, and a commitment to public service. It is administered by the Harry S. Truman Scholarship Foundation, an independent federal agency based in Washington, D.C.

Congress created the scholarship in 1975 as a living memorial to the 33rd president of the United States. Instead of a statue, the Truman Scholarship is the official federal memorial to its namesake president. According to The Washington Post, the Truman Scholarship's "sole aim is to pick out people with potential to become leaders—then provide support to help them realize their aspirations." The scholarship supports public service oriented graduate study in the amount of $30,000.

Each year, between 50 and 60 university nominated candidates in their junior year are named Truman Scholars following a rigorous application process involving essays, recommendations, and an interview. Scholarships have historically been awarded to one individual from each U.S. state. Each university in the United States may nominate, annually, only four regularly-enrolled candidates, and up to three transfer students, who represent the most accomplished nominees from that university.

History 
 
On May 30, 1974, Senator Stuart Symington of Missouri sponsored S.3548, formally titled "A bill to establish the Harry S. Truman Memorial Scholarships." Symington held the same Class 1 Senate seat that Truman had held from 1935–1945 before becoming Vice President. The Senate passed the bill on August 2, and the House followed suit on December 17. Two similar House bills, H.R.15138 sponsored by William J. Randall of Missouri and H.R.17481 sponsored by James G. O'Hara of Michigan, were set aside in favor of Symington's bill.

The bill was signed by President Gerald Ford and enacted as Public Law 93-642 on January 4, 1975 and entered the United States Statutes at Large as 88 Stat. 2276–2280, and the United States Code as 20 U.S.C. 2001–2013. It now operates as Program 85.001, governed by 45 CFR 1801 as published in the Code of Federal Regulations in the Federal Register.

Governance 
The Truman Scholarship is administered by the Harry S. Truman Scholarship Foundation, an independent federal executive branch agency. It is governed by a 13-member Board of Trustees previously headed by President Madeleine Albright, who said that the foundation "serves as a gateway for America's public service leaders" and "does a remarkable job of identifying future change agents." The Foundation's operations are overseen by full-time Executive Secretary Terry Babcock-Lumish.  Its endowment, which takes the form of a federal trust fund held in the U.S. Department of the Treasury, is $55 million. Current Board members include Senator Roy Blunt, Senator Brian Schatz, Secretary of Education Miguel Cardona, Congresswoman Kay Granger, and Congressman Ted Deutch.

Qualifications 
The scholarship is awarded to between 50 and 60 U.S. college juniors each year on the basis of four criteria: service on campus and in the community, commitment to a career in public service (government, uniformed services, research, education, or public interest/advocacy organizations), communication ability and aptitude to be a "change agent," and academic talent that would assure acceptance to a first-rate graduate school.  More broadly, Truman Scholars possess intellect, leadership skills, and passion that would make them a likely force for the public good in any field.

Application process 
In order to apply for the scholarship, students must first be nominated by their undergraduate university. Each undergraduate institution in the United States is allowed to nominate up to four students who have attended since freshman year. The foundation receives 900 applications annually, of which between 50 and 60 will be selected. Each application is examined by a regional review panel, which selects finalists to interview. The interviews are conducted by panels of former Truman scholars, trustees of the board, and notable national public servants. The panelists make final selections of scholarship winners, attempting to choose one from each of the 50 states and American territories. No particular career, service interest, or policy field is preferred during the process.  Each year, the Truman Scholarship is awarded to one or two students from institutions that have never had a Truman Scholar.

Benefits 
Scholars currently receive an award of $30,000 going toward up to three years of graduate education leading to a career in the public service. Winners also benefit from a network of other scholars through the Truman Scholars Association and lasting friendship, which is encouraged by the Truman Scholars Leadership Week at William Jewell College in Liberty, Missouri, and the Truman Library in Independence, Missouri, during which new scholars collaborate on policy projects.

Notable Truman Scholars

See also 
 Boettcher Scholarship
 Churchill Scholarship
The Flinn Scholarship
 Fulbright Scholarship
 Gates Cambridge Scholarship
 Harkness Fellowship
 Jardine Scholarship
 Knight-Hennessy Scholars
 Marshall Scholarship
 Mitchell Scholarship
 Presidential memorials in the United States
 Rhodes Scholarship
 Rotary Scholarships
 Schwarzman Scholars
 Thouron Award
 Udall Scholarship
 Yenching Scholarship

References

External links 
 The Harry S. Truman Scholarship Foundation
 Truman Scholars Association
 Truman Alumni Directory on bigsight.org

Monuments and memorials to Harry S. Truman
Scholarships in the United States